Valstrona is a comune (municipality) in the Province of Verbano-Cusio-Ossola in the Italian region Piedmont, located about  northeast of Turin and about  southwest of Verbania.

Valstrona borders the following municipalities: Anzola d'Ossola, Calasca-Castiglione, Cravagliana, Loreglia, Massiola, Ornavasso, Pieve Vergonte, Quarna Sopra, Quarna Sotto, Rimella, Sabbia, Varallo Sesia.

References